East Money Information Co., Ltd., is a Chinese financial and stock information website provider. In July 2015, 23.6 million people a day used its website Eastmoney.com.

The company is listed on the Shenzhen stock exchange, was founded by Chinese billionaire Qi Shi, offers both free and paid-for information, and had  23.6 million people a day in July 2015.

In October 2015, they expected their nine-month profit to rise by over 2,000% to US$220–236 million.

References

External links
 

Companies in the CSI 100 Index
Companies listed on the Shenzhen Stock Exchange
Companies based in Shanghai